The 1989 South American Championships in Athletics were held in Medellín, Colombia, between 5 and 8 August.

Medal summary

Men's events

Women's events

A = affected by altitude

Medal table

See also
1989 in athletics (track and field)

External links
 Men Results – GBR Athletics
 Women Results – GBR Athletics

South American
South American Championships in Athletics
International athletics competitions hosted by Colombia
South American
1989 in South American sport